Oliver Bogner (born February 11, 1993) is an American television producer for All3Media America, a part of Discovery Communications.

Bogner has been profiled by the Los Angeles Times, Forbes Magazine, USA Today, Elite Daily, the OC Register, and has been listed twice in Forbes on its "Hollywood 30 Under 30 Power List", in January 2013 and January 2014. Forbes also profiled Bogner as the youngest reality television producer in Hollywood.

Education
Bogner attended Chapman University.

References

1993 births
Living people
American television producers
Chapman University alumni